The 14017 / 14018 Sadbhavna Express is an express train belonging to Northern Railway zone that runs between  and  via  in India. It is currently being operated with 14017/14018 train numbers on a weekly basis.

Service

The 14017/Sadbhavna Express has an average speed of 44 km/hr and covers 1299 km in 29h 45m. The 14018/Sadbhavana Express has an average speed of 42 km/hr and covers 1299 km in 30h 40m.

Route & Halts 

The important halts of the train are:

Coach composition

The train has standard ICF rakes with max speed of 110 kmph. The train consists of 20 coaches:

 2 AC III Tier
 9 Sleeper Coaches
 7 General
 2 Seating cum Luggage Rake

Traction

Both trains are hauled by a Tughlakabad-based WDM-3A or WDP-4D diesel locomotive from Raxaul to Delhi and vice versa.

Rake sharing 

The train shares its rake with 14013/14014 Sultanpur–Anand Vihar Sadbhavana Express.

See also 

 Raxaul Junction railway station
 Delhi Junction railway station
 Sadbhawna Express (via Sagauli)
 Sadbhavna Express (via Sitamarhi)

Notes

References

External links 

 14017/Sadbhavana Express (via Faizabad)
 14018/Sadbhavana Express (via Faizabad)

Transport in Raxaul
Transport in Delhi
Named passenger trains of India
Rail transport in Delhi
Rail transport in Bihar
Rail transport in Uttar Pradesh
Railway services introduced in 1997
Express trains in India